Shatakhali Union is a union parishad situated at Shalikha Upazila,  in Magura District, Khulna Division of Bangladesh. There are 14 villages and 14 mouzas in the union.

References

External links
 

Unions of Khulna Division
Unions of Shalikha Upazila
Unions of Magura District